Wolves of the Air is a 1927 American silent action film directed by Francis Ford and starring Johnnie Walker, Lois Boyd and Maurice Costello. It is now considered a lost film. In 2021 this so called lost film was retrieved in the collection of the Dordrecht Regional Archives, and is in excellent condition.

Returning from serving in World War I, Bob Warne finds that his father's airplane factory has been taken over. Getting employment at a rival factory, he enters an air race in order to win a government contract. Despite repeated attempts at sabotage he is triumphant.

Cast
 Johnnie Walker as Bob Warne
 Lois Boyd as Peggy Tanner
 Maurice Costello as Bob's Father
 Mildred Harris as Marceline Manning
 Gayne Whitman as Evan Steele
 William Boyd as Jerry Tanner
 Billy Bletcher as 'Big Boy' Durkey
 Bud Jamison as 'Short-Cut' McGee

References

Bibliography
 Paris, Michael. From the Wright Brothers to Top Gun: Aviation, Nationalism, and Popular Cinema. Manchester University Press, 1995.

External links
 

1927 films
1920s action films
American silent feature films
American action films
Films directed by Francis Ford
1920s English-language films
1920s American films